The Compleat Housewife; or, Accomplish'd Gentlewoman's Companion is a cookery book written by Eliza Smith and first published in London in 1727. It became extremely popular, running through 18 editions in fifty years.

It was the first cookery book to be published in the Thirteen Colonies of America: it was printed in Williamsburg, Virginia, in 1742. It contained the first published recipe for "katchup", and appears to be the earliest source for bread and butter pudding.

The book includes recipes not only for foods but for wines, cordial-waters, medicines and salves.

Book

The title page describes The Compleat Housewife as a

The book was the first to publish a recipe for "Katchup"; it included mushrooms, anchovies and horseradish. The title The Compleat Housewife may owe something to Gervase Markham's 1615 The English Huswife.

Little is known of Smith beyond what she writes of herself in the preface. She spent her life working as a cook or housekeeper in wealthy households, and unlike Elizabeth Raffald who left service to run her own shop, continued in that profession despite the success of her book. It is possible that she worked at Beaulieu Abbey, Hampshire. She is critical of cookery books written by men who conceal their secrets, preventing readers from using their recipes successfully.

The preface contains the following passage:

The passage was lightly adapted from an earlier book with a similar title, John Nott's The Cooks and Confectioners Dictionary: or, the Accomplish’d Housewife’s Companion (1723), which declared he had added an introduction because fashion had made it as odd for a book to be printed without one as for a man to be seen "in church without a neck cloth or a lady without a hoop-petticoat."

Contents
The following refer to the 9th edition, 1739.

 Preface
 A Bill of Fare for every Season of the Year.
 Cookery, &c. Page 1. [Soups, meats, pies, pickles, fish, hams, sausages, cheese]
 All Sorts of Pickles. Page 78.
 All Sorts of Puddings. Page 100.
 All Sorts of Pastry. Page 122.
 All Sorts of Cakes. Page 144.
 Creams and Jellies. Page 160.
 Preserves, Conserves, and Syrups. Page 173.
 All Sorts of Made Wines. Page 213.
 All Sorts of Cordial-waters. Page 232.
 Medicines and Salves. Page 272.

Approach
Smith offers no general advice, either at the start of the book or at the start of chapters; each chapter consists entirely of recipes. There are no lists of ingredients, these simply being mentioned as needed in the recipes. Most recipes do not mention either oven temperature or cooking time, though for example "To candy Orange Flowers" instructs "set your glasses in a stove with a moderate heat", and "To Stew a Rump of Beef" states "this requires six or seven hours stewing."

The recipes are predominantly English, but dishes include French and other foreign names, and imported ingredients such as spices.

Recipes are described tersely, and do not generally spell out basic techniques such as how to make pastry; the recipe for "A Battalia Pye" does not mention pastry at all, though it is called for with the instruction to "close the pye":

However, a few frequently-used components of dishes are described, such as "A Lear for Savoury Pyes" and "A Ragoo for made Dishes". The "Lear" is a thickened sauce made with claret, gravy, "oyster liquor", anchovies, herbs, onion and butter. The "Ragoo" contains similar ingredients, with the addition of sliced meats and mushrooms; the recipe ends with "use it when called for", such as in the Battalia Pye.

Recipes are provided for home-made medicines and remedies such as "To promote Breeding" for women wanting to become pregnant. The recipe calls for a spoonful of "stinking orrice" syrup to be taken night and morning, and for "good ale" to be boiled with "the piths of 3 ox-backs, half a handful of clary, a handful of nep (or cat-bos)", dates, raisins, and nutmegs. The woman drinking this mixture "at your going to-bed" is enjoined "as long as it lasts, accompany not with your husband."

Publication

Britain
The book was first published in 1727 and ran through 18 editions by 1773. The first four editions were published under the byline "E— S—", but Smith did reveal she was a woman "constantly employed in fashionable and noble Families ... for the Space of thirty Years and upwards". The fifth edition of 1732 gave the author's name as "E. Smith".

The bibliographer William Carew Hazlitt recorded that the 7th edition included "near fifty Receipts being communicated just before the author's death".

America
The Compleat Housewife was the first cookery book to be published in America, when William Parks, an ambitious and enterprising printer (originally from Shropshire) printed it in Williamsburg, Virginia in 1742. His version of The Compleat Housewife, a "cookery book of ambitious scope", was based on the fifth London edition of 1732, altered to suit American taste, and without recipes "the ingredients or materials for which are not to be had in this country." Copies of the 1742 edition have become very rare, but "happily, one copy has returned to the city of its origin", and is in the Library of Colonial Williamsburg, Incorporated.

Reception

In 1893, the bibliographer William Carew Hazlitt allocated 54 pages of his history of cookery books to the Compleat Housewife, commenting that "the highly curious contents of E. Smith ... may be securely taken to exhibit the state of knowledge in England upon this subject in the last quarter of the seventeenth and the first quarter of the eighteenth [century]".

Christine Mitchell, reviewing the Chawton House reprint in 2010 for the Jane Austen Society of North America,  wrote that Eliza Smith's book "met the growing need for a text to assist women with their task of maintaining a household." She quotes Elizabeth Wallace's introduction as saying that it gives modern readers reason to appreciate having a refrigerator and a global food system that brings us out-of-season produce. Yet, she observes, the English housewife had many varieties of vegetables, 30 kinds of seafood and 35 kinds of poultry (including hares and rabbits). She notes that the book also describes home remedies, the housewife having to function as " chef, doctor, pharmacist, exterminator, chemist, laundress, and all-around handy-woman." Reflecting that the recipes would "probably never" be used today, and the medicines are useless, the book remains invaluable for researchers, gives readers a glimpse into the world of Jane Austen and her contemporaries, and richly documents eighteenth-century English life.

Patrick Spedding, in Script & Print, notes that the book was very popular in the eighteenth century, with 20 London editions in fifty years. However, he roundly criticises the 1983 Arlon House facsimile reprint of the 16th edition for deliberately omitting recipes including "To promote Breeding", suggesting this was because the publisher was concerned they might be harmful.

The historian Sandra Sherman comments that The Compleat Housewife "is the first female-authored blockbuster."

The bibliographer Genevieve Yost comments that "E. Smith's popularity in eighteenth century England was challenged perhaps most seriously by Hannah Glasse, who admittedly is better remembered today", adding at once that Glasse is recalled mainly for the controversy over whether she actually existed, and for the recipe that people supposed started with "First catch your hare." Yost suggests that the book's popularity in the colonies was probably increased by the publication of an American edition. She concludes that

In the Spring 2006 issue of Prairie Schooner, Sarah Kennedy published a poem called "The Compleat Housewife, 1727", with the gloss "the first popular cookbook published in Great Britain". The poem begins:

Editions

Notes

References

English cuisine
English non-fiction books
Early Modern cookbooks
1727 books
Books involved in plagiarism controversies